The following sortable table comprises the 117 highest mountain peaks of the U.S. State of Colorado with at least  of elevation and at least  of topographic prominence.

Topographic elevation is the vertical distance above the reference geoid, a mathematical model of the Earth's sea level as an equipotential gravitational surface.  The topographic prominence of a summit is the elevation difference between that summit and the highest or key col to a higher summit.  The topographic isolation of a summit is the minimum great-circle distance to a point of equal elevation.

This article defines a significant summit as a summit with at least  of topographic prominence, and a major summit as a summit with at least  of topographic prominence.  An ultra-prominent summit is a summit with at least  of topographic prominence.  There are three ultra-prominent summits in Colorado.

All elevations in this article include an elevation adjustment from the National Geodetic Vertical Datum of 1929 (NGVD 29) to the North American Vertical Datum of 1988 (NAVD 88).  For further information, please see this United States National Geodetic Survey note.

If an elevation or prominence is calculated as a range of values, the arithmetic mean is shown.

Highest major summits

Gallery

See also

List of mountain peaks of North America
List of mountain peaks of Greenland
List of mountain peaks of Canada
List of mountain peaks of the Rocky Mountains
List of mountain peaks of the United States
List of mountain peaks of Alaska
List of mountain peaks of California
List of mountain peaks of Colorado

List of the major 4000-meter summits of Colorado
List of Colorado fourteeners
List of the most prominent summits of Colorado
List of mountain ranges of Colorado
List of mountain peaks of Hawaii
List of mountain peaks of México
List of mountain peaks of Central America
List of mountain peaks of the Caribbean
Colorado
Geography of Colorado
:Category:Mountains of Colorado
commons:Category:Mountains of Colorado
Physical geography
Topography
Topographic elevation
Topographic prominence
Topographic isolation

Notes

References

External links

National Geodetic Survey (NGS)
NGS Datasheets
NGVD 29 to NAVD 88 online elevation converter @ NGS
Geodetic Glossary @ NGS
United States Geological Survey (USGS)
Geographic Names Information System @ USGS
Colorado Geological Survey

World Mountain Encyclopedia @ peakware.com
peaklist.org
summitpost.org

 

Lists of landforms of Colorado
Colorado, List Of The Highest Major Summits Of
Colorado, List Of The Highest Major Summits Of
Colorado, List Of The Highest Major Summits Of